Aeonium sedifolium is a perennial flowering plant in the stonecrop family Crassulaceae. The plant is native to the western Canary Islands of Tenerife, La Gomera and La Palma.

Description
Aeonium sedifolium is a perennial, herbaceous plant or small shrub with branched stems. The flower rosettes are small compared to most aeoniums, and consist of thick and fleshy oval shaped or a trowel shaped leaves. The young leaves look similar to the leaves of genus Sedum. The leaves are sticky and are initially green, but soon form red stripes on them.

Its inflorescence is a little bundle of small, golden yellow flowers that bloom from April to May.

Naming and etymology
The botanical name Aeonium  comes from the ancient Greek word "aionios" (eternal), because it retains its leaves.

Habitat and distribution
Aeonium sedifolium grows in full sun or partial shade on eroded volcanic soil.
The plant is native to western Tenerife in the Canary Islands, the islands of La Palma and La Gomera.

References

Flora Vascular de Canarias
Tropicos
www.rareplants.de

sedifolium